Nova Štifta is a small settlement in the Municipality of Sodražica in southern Slovenia. The area is part of the traditional region of Lower Carniola and is now included in the Southeast Slovenia Statistical Region.

Church

Nova Štifta is best known for its pilgrimage church dedicated to the Assumption of Mary. It is a Baroque church with an exterior arcade. It was built between 1641 and 1671 and was commissioned by the Jurij Khisl, lord of the castle in Ribnica, after a mysterious light appeared at Juniper Hill (Brinov vrh), as the site is known. The church has an octagonal nave and a smaller square chancel with beveled corners. The cupola rises  and is topped by a belfry with a Baroque roof. The church is probably based on the Renaissance Coronation of the Virgin Church in Lodi, Italy, which was a model for many later churches in Slovenia.

References

External links
Nova Štifta on Geopedia

Populated places in the Municipality of Sodražica